Peter Marlow may refer to:

 Peter Marlow (athlete) (born 1941), British racewalker
 Peter Marlow (photographer) (1952–2016), British news photographer